John Allan ( – 14 February 1897) was a Scottish professional golfer. He was the professional at Royal North Devon Golf Club from 1867 until the late 1880s.

Early life
Allan was born in Prestwick, Scotland, . He was the son of Hugh and Mary Allan. Two of his younger brothers, Matthew (1858–1890) and Jamie (1861–1900) also became professional golfers.

Golf career
Allan learnt his golf at Prestwick Golf Club while Old Tom Morris was there. After bried periods at Aberbeen and St. Andrews, he became the professional at Royal North Devon Golf Club, Westward Ho! in 1867. He remained at Westward Ho! for about 20 years before returning to Scotland to take up a position at Prestwick St. Nicholas Golf Club.

While at Royal North Devon, Allan was involved in the design of Kingsdown Golf Club in 1880 and Royal Cornwall Golf Club in the late 1880s.

Death
Allan died in Prestwick on 14 February 1897 aged 49.

Results in major championships

Note: Allan only played in The Open Championship.

NT = No tournament
WD = Withdrew
"T" indicates a tie for a place

Source:

References

Scottish male golfers
1847 births
1897 deaths